The High Court Building of Hong Kong is located at 38 Queensway, Admiralty, and is home to the High Court.

The 20 storey building was built in 1985 as the home of the then Supreme Court of Hong Kong, which was renamed in 1997. The structure is a white clad tower and has a water fountain outside its front door. Demonstration and media coverage take place at the entrance of the building.

External links
 

1985 establishments in Hong Kong
Admiralty, Hong Kong
Landmarks in Hong Kong